Ramakrishna (Telugu: రామకృష్ణ) was an Indian actor who worked in Telugu cinema. He has acted in over 200 films, including Telugu, Tamil, and Malayalam. He has acted in several super hit Telugu movies such as 'Nomu', 'Pooja', 'Nenu Naa Desam', 'Bomma Borusa', 'Badi panthulu', 'Kurukshetram', 'Yuvataram kadilindi', 'Mantralaya Sri Raghavendra Vaaibhavam', 'Hantakulostunnaru jagrattha', 'Magadu', 'Katakatala Rudraiah', 'Doralu Dongalu', 'Kotalo paga', 'Viswanatha Nayakudu'. He played various roles in several mythological films, including Yashoda Krishna, Vinayaka Vijayamu, Devude digivasthe. He had also acted alongside thespians N. T. Ramarao and Akkineni Nageswara Rao.

He was a stage actor from Bhimavaram in West Godavari district of Andhra Pradesh, moved to Chennai in the 1950s. His movie debut was in 1960 in Nithya Kalyanam Pachathoranam.

His first marriage was with a woman in Bhimavaram. He had a daughter through her. He left his first wife and daughter and came to Madras. He married Telugu actress Geetanjali in 1974 and has a son 'Srinivas'. He died in 2001.

Filmography

References

Mantaralaya Sree Raghavendra Vaibhavam (1981)

External links
 

1939 births
2001 deaths
Telugu male actors
People from West Godavari district